Lubatówka , is a village in the administrative district of Gmina Iwonicz-Zdrój, within Krosno County, Subcarpathian Voivodeship, in south-eastern Poland.

The village has a population of 1,100.

References
Notes

Villages in Krosno County